Misan Harriman (born 1977) is a Nigerian-born British photographer, entrepreneur and social activist. As well as being one of the most widely-shared photographers of the Black Lives Matter movement, Harriman is the first black man to shoot a cover of British Vogue in the magazine's 104-year history. In July 2021 Harriman commenced his appointment as Chair of the Southbank Centre, London.

Early life
Harriman was born in Calabar, Nigeria, in 1977. He is the son of Chief Hope Harriman (a businessman and politician from Warri in Nigeria's Delta State). He attended Stubbington House School and Bradfield College in England. After school, Harriman worked in recruitment in the City of London.

Photographic career
Harriman was interested in photography from an early age, this including giving a presentation at school on Stanley Kubrick's use of light in Barry Lyndon (1975) aged nine. In 2016 Harriman set up an Internet media agency, What We Seee. He began photographing in 2017 and is self-taught.

Harriman's photographic career has included photographing a diverse list of celebrities, including Rihanna, Stormzy, Olivia Colman, Princess Beatrice, Meghan, Duchess of Sussex, Cate Blanchett, Chiwetel Ejiofor, and Tom Cruise, as well as documenting the Extinction Rebellion, climate strike and anti-Trump protests in 2019. In the spring of 2020, Harriman took a series of pictures of people living through the COVID-19 lockdown in his home town of Woking in a project called Lost in Isolation. His pictures of the Black Lives Matter protests taken in the summer of 2020 appeared on the BBC and in Vogue magazine and The Guardian, and in July were shown on the Piccadilly Lights at Piccadilly Circus in Central London. Harriman's triple gatefold cover for the September issue of Vogue—traditionally the most important issue of the year—included portraits of Adwoa Aboah, Marcus Rashford and 18 other activists associated with the Black Lives Matter movement from around the globe. He was assisted by two photographers, Cornelius Walker and Ron Timehin. In early 2021 Harriman remotely took the photograph used to announce the pregnancy of Meghan, Duchess of Sussex.

In July 2021, Harriman took up the appointment of chair of trustees of the Southbank Centre.

In June 2022, Harriman photographed Lilibet Mountbatten-Windsor, the daughter of the Duke and Duchess of Sussex and granddaughter of King Charles III.

Personal life
Harriman is married and has two children.

References

External links

What We Seee

English people of Nigerian descent
People educated at Bradfield College
Fashion photographers
British portrait photographers
Nigerian photographers
Living people
People educated at Stubbington House School
People from Woking
People from Calabar
Date of birth missing (living people)
1977 births
21st-century British photographers
21st-century British male artists